Hugh Bennett may refer to:

 Hugh Hammond Bennett (1881–1960), soil conservation pioneer
 Hugh Bennett (cricketer) (1862–1943), English cricketer
 Hugh Bennett (editor), editor of the film Arrowsmith and others